North Sligo was a parliamentary constituency in Ireland, which returned one Member of Parliament (MP) to the House of Commons of the Parliament of the United Kingdom, elected on a system of first-past-the-post, from 1885 to 1922.

Prior to the 1885 general election the area was part of the two-seat Sligo constituency. From 1922, on the establishment of the Irish Free State, it was not represented in the UK Parliament.

Boundaries
This constituency comprised the northern part of County Sligo.

1885–1922: The baronies of Carbury and Tireragh, and that part of the barony of Leyny contained within the parishes of Ballysadare and Killoran.

Members of Parliament

Elections

Elections in the 1880s

Elections in the 1890s
McDonald dies, prompting a by-election.

Elections in the 1900s
Collery resigns, causing a by-election.

McHugh dies, causing a by-election.

Elections in the 1910s

References

The Parliaments of England by Henry Stooks Smith (1st edition published in three volumes 1844–50), 2nd edition edited (in one volume) by F.W.S. Craig (Political Reference Publications 1973)

Historic constituencies in County Sligo
Westminster constituencies in County Sligo (historic)
Dáil constituencies in the Republic of Ireland (historic)
Constituencies of the Parliament of the United Kingdom established in 1885
Constituencies of the Parliament of the United Kingdom disestablished in 1922